The National Center of Cinematography is the largest film distributor and film production company in the cinema of Albania connected with over 700 films (feature films and documentaries) between 1947 and 2012. The studio has produced and distributed the vast majority of Albanian films. Especially important was its work in the 1970s and 1980s when the studio averaged 75–80 movies per year.

History
The Centre of Cinematography was established in 1945 as the Agency of Albanian Films and in 1947 it was transformed into the Albanian Cinematographical National Company. At that time all the movie theatres were nationalised, so the company was in charge of both movie production and management of theatres. In May 1948 the company presented its first cinematographic chronicle. It also contributed in the 1940s and 1950s with the building of many movie theatres throughout Albania. In 1952, the movie studio called "Albania National Centre of Cinematography", was created, which lasted until 1992, and was replaced by the Albafilm-Tirana (1992–1996).

In 1996 the current National Center of Cinematography was created by a government decree.

Filmography

1940s
1 Maj 1949 (1949) ... Distributor

1950s
Dritë mbi Shqipëri (1958) ... Distributor
Takim vëllazëror (1958) ... Distributor

1960s
25 vjetori i Kongresit të parë të BGSH (1969) ... Distributor
Ai është bir i klasës punëtore (1969) ... Distributor
Biri i Mirditës (1969) ... Distributor
Drini u thye (1969) ... Distributor
Këngë e valle nga gurra popullore (1969) ... Distributor
Në kampin e pionerëve-Vlorë (1969) ... Distributor
Nepër rrugët e dritës (1969) ... Distributor
Nga festivali artistik i fëmijve (1969) ... Distributor
Njësiti guerril (1969) ... Distributor
Përmes terrenit të infektuar (1969) ... Distributor
Për një zhvillim më të shpejtë të shpendëve (1969) ... Distributor
Për rendimente të larta në misër (1969) ... Distributor
Perse bie kjo daulle (1969) ... Distributor
Reportazh nga Mirdita (1969) ... Distributor
Rruga jote, shok (1969) ... Distributor
Shkolla dhe praktika (1969) ... Distributor
Toka të përtërira (1969) ... Distributor
Vojo Kushi (1969) ... Distributor
90 vjetori i Lidhjes së Prizrenit (1968) ... Distributor
Dita e pionerit (1968) ... Distributor
Horizonte te hapura (1968) ... Distributor
Kalitemi nepërmjet aksioneve (1968) ... Distributor
Këngët e të vegjëlve (1968) ... Distributor
Lart flamujt e aksioneve (1968) ... Distributor
Mbresa vullnetarësh (1968) ... Distributor
Ne mbrojmë Atdheun Socialist (1968) ... Distributor
Në ndihmë të koperativave malore (1968) ... Distributor
Për zhvillimin intensiv të lopës (1968) ... Distributor
Pusteci (1968) ... Distributor
Trim mbi trima (1968) ... Distributor
Vatra e flakës së madhe (1968) ... Distributor
Vrulli i mendimit krijues të masave (1968) ... Distributor
Ato çajnë përpara (1967) ... Distributor
Biri i Partisë (1967) ... Distributor
Gra heroike shqiptare përpara (1967) ... Distributor
Inciativa krijuse e masave (1967) ... Distributor
Lart flamujt e kuq (1967) ... Distributor
Letër nga mjeku i Kuçit (1967) ... Distributor
Më tepër ujë për tokën (1967) ... Distributor
Miqësi revolucionare (1967) ... Distributor
Në gjurmët partizane (1967) ... Distributor
Rritje (1967) ... Distributor
Të fala nga fshati (1967) ... Distributor
Ata nuk vdesin (1966) ... Distributor
Çajupi (1966) ... Distributor
Fitimtarët (1966) ... Distributor
Kënga të buçasë (1966) ... Distributor
Kjo është toka jonë (1966) ... Distributor
Maleve me dëborë (1966) ... Distributor
Me forcat tona (1966) ... Distributor
Miqësi e madhe unitet luftarak (1966) ... Distributor
Ndre Mjeda (1966) ... Distributor
Në sharat e Sopotit (1966) ... Distributor
Plehrat organike (1966) ... Distributor
Poema e të njëzetmijve (1966) ... Distributor
Shkolla e fshatit malor (1966) ... Distributor
Taracat në bjeshkë (1966) ... Distributor
Të parët në rrugën e kolektivizimit (1966) ... Distributor
Cirk (1965) ... Distributor
Në praktikë me studentët natyralistë (1965) ... Distributor
Në rjedhën e jetës (1965) ... Distributor
Njerzit dhe veprat (1965) ... Distributor
Përse mendojnë këto male (1965) ... Distributor
Policia popullore në shërbim (1965) ... Distributor
Posta kufitare (1965) ... Distributor
Takim me Arbreshët (1965) ... Distributor
Vangjush Mio (1965) ... Distributor
Vitet e para (1965) ... Distributor
Zbuluesit në stërvitje (1965) ... Distributor
Anës së Drinit (1964) ... Distributor
Drejt përmisimit të blegtorisë (1964) ... Distributor
Gurët dekorativë (1964) ... Distributor
Heshtje që flet (1964) ... Distributor
Krah për krah (1964) ... Distributor
Kronikë ngjarjesh (1964) ... Distributor

1970s
Ansambli folkloristik krahinor i Kosovës (1979) ... Distributor
Ansambli Labëria në Maqedoni (1979) ... Distributor
Ansambli Marinela në Shqipëri (1979) ... Distributor
Ansambli ynë në Itali (1979) ... Distributor
Ballë për ballë (1979) ... Distributor
Balonat (1979) ... Distributor
Çeta e vogël (1979) ... Distributor
Ditët që sollën pranverën (1979) (TV) ... Distributor
Drejt mjeshtërisë (1979) ... Distributor
Erinda dhe kukulla (1979) ... Distributor
Këshilltarët (1979) ... Distributor
Liri a vdekje (1979) ... Distributor
Lufton Mujo Ulqinaku (1979) ... Distributor
Manifestimi i forcës, shëndetit dhe bukurisë (1979) ... Distributor
Me forcat tona me hov revolucionar (1979) ... Distributor
Mësonjëtorja (1979) ... Distributor
Mysafiri (1979) ... Distributor
Nepër Turqi (1979) ... Distributor
Ne shtepine tone (1979) ... Distributor
Ne vinim nga lufta (1979) ... Distributor
Përtej mureve të gurta (1979) ... Distributor
Radiostacioni (1979) ... Distributor
Teatri krahinor i Prishtinës (1979) ... Distributor
Të zhdukurit (1979) ... Distributor
Uzinë mishi dhe vezësh (1979) ... Distributor
Yje mbi Drin (1979) ... Distributor
Ansambli Migjeni në Turqi (1978) ... Distributor
Bariu i Matit (1978) ... Distributor
Dollia e dasmës sime (1978) ... Distributor
Festa e ujit (1978) ... Distributor
Gjeneral gramafoni (1978) ... Distributor
Gjyshi partizan (1978) ... Distributor
Këndon Atdheu ynë (1978) ... Distributor
Këngët tona për ty Parti (1978) ... Distributor
Koncert në vitin 1936 (1978) ... Distributor
Lumja ti moj Shqipëri (1978) ... Distributor
Mbrojtja e Atdheut detyrë mbi detyrat (1978) ... Distributor
Mjelësja e dalluar (1978) ... Distributor
Ne jemi lulet e partisë (1978) ... Distributor
Në roje të shëndetit (1978) ... Distributor
Nga mesi i errësirës (1978) ... Distributor
Nusja dhe shtetërrethimi (1978) ... Distributor
Pas gjurmëve (1978) ... Distributor
Përse kështu (1978) ... Distributor
Pranverë në Gjirokastër (1978) ... Distributor
Qytet i lashtë, qytet i ri (1978) ... Distributor
Riza Cerova (1978) ... Distributor
Shkrimtari militant (1978) ... Distributor
Sukses i ri i ansamblit Dajti në Greqi (1978) ... Distributor
Ushtri e popullit ushtar (1978) ... Distributor
Vajzat me kordele të kuqe (1978) ... Distributor
Anës Bunës (1977) ... Distributor
Ansambli amator Migjeni në Kosovë (1977) ... Distributor
Ansambli ynë në Greqi (1977) ... Distributor
Aty është folur me pushkë dhe penë për Shqipërinë (1977) ... Distributor
Bilbili i Labërisë (1977) ... Distributor
Biografia e një nëne (1977) ... Distributor
Blerim i ri në fshat (1977) ... Distributor
Çeta jonë vullnetare guri i kështjellës së madhe (1977) ... Distributor
Cirku në fshat (1977) ... Distributor
Fëmijët tanë (1977) ... Distributor
Festë e gëzuar (1977) ... Distributor
Frymëzim nga jeta (1977) ... Distributor
Gunat mbi tela (1977) ... Distributor
Heronjtë e Vigut (1977) ... Distributor
Kukësi i ri (1977) ... Distributor
Kuvënd i madh i rinisë (1977) ... Distributor
Matematika dhe prodhimi (1977) ... Distributor
Mendimi krijues i tekstilisteve (1977) ... Distributor
Me studentët ushtarakë (1977) ... Distributor
Mjekësia popullore (1977) ... Distributor
Nepër tunelin e Qaf Thanës (1977) ... Distributor
Njeriu me top (1977) ... Distributor
Një udhëtim i vështirë (1977) ... Distributor
Odhise Paskali (1977) ... Distributor
Oreksi i humbur (1977) ... Distributor
Perimet burim shëndeti (1977) ... Distributor
Pranverë në zemrat tona (1977) ... Distributor
Shëmbja e idhujve (1977) ... Distributor
Streha e re (1977) ... Distributor
Të rejat tekstiliste (1977) ... Distributor
Thesarë nën pisha (1977) ... Distributor
Tomka dhe shokët e tij (1977) ... Distributor
Tri dekada të filmit shqiptar (1977) ... Distributor
Urat e Kukësit (1977) ... Distributor
Vajzat e metalurgjisë (1977) ... Distributor
Fije që priten (1976) ... Distributor
Ansambli i Këngëve dhe valleve popullore në Suedi e Norvegji (1976) ... Distributor
Asdreni, poet i lulëkuqes dhe vegjëlisë (1976) ... Distributor
Brigadierja (1976) ... Distributor
Dimri i fundit (1976) ... Distributor
Drejt dritës (1976) ... Distributor
Dritë në tunel (1976) ... Distributor
Fëmijët dhe kukllat (1976) ... Distributor
Fshati malor (1976) ... Distributor
Gjithmonë të gatshëm (1976) ... Distributor
Illegalët (1976) ... Distributor
Ishte dikur një legjendë (1976) ... Distributor
Kaliza e grurit (1976) ... Distributor
Kryeqyteti ynë (1976) ... Distributor
Lasgush Poradeci (1976) ... Distributor
Lisharsi (1976) ... Distributor
Lulekuqet mbi mure (1976) ... Distributor
Majlinda dhe zogu i vogël (1976) ... Distributor
Malësorët pas komisarëve (1976) ... Distributor
Më shpejt, më large (1976) ... Distributor
Më shpejt, më lart, më large (1976) ... Distributor
Në gjirin e klasës (1976) ... Distributor
Në Këlmend (1976) ... Distributor
Në skajin më Jugor (1976) ... Distributor
Në udhët e sukseseve (1976) ... Distributor
Njeriu i punës (1976) ... Distributor
Normat teknike (1976) ... Distributor
Onufri (1976) ... Distributor
Perballimi (1976) ... Distributor
Për shëndetin e popullit (1976) ... Distributor
Pika e ujit (1976) ... Distributor
Populli në këmbë Partia në ballë (1976) ... Distributor
Qershori dhe gruri (1976) ... Distributor
Racionalizatorët e një kombinati (1976) ... Distributor
Shtëpitë malore të pushimit (1976) ... Distributor
Sistemimi i tokave (1976) ... Distributor
Tinguj lufte (1976) ... Distributor
Tokë e përgjakur (1976) ... Distributor
Tregimi për kohën e lirë (1976) ... Distributor
Udhët e artit (1976) ... Distributor
Ujrat termale (1976) ... Distributor
Unitet që mposht tërmete (1976) ... Distributor
Valbonë '76 (1976) ... Distributor
Zonja nga qyteti (1976) ... Distributor
1000 pse? (1975) ... Distributor
Ansambli i Korçës në Kosovë (1975) ... Distributor
Artilerija e xhepit (1975) ... Distributor
Bakri ynë (1975) ... Distributor
Beni ecën vetë (1975) ... Distributor
Brigada (1975) ... Distributor
Cifti i lumtur (1975) ... Distributor
Derri fabrikë mishi (1975) ... Distributor
Dhëmbët dhe shëndeti (1975) ... Distributor
Drenazhimi i tokës (1975) ... Distributor
Duart e arta të racionalizatorëve (1975) ... Distributor
Fierza ushton (1975) ... Distributor
Flora shqiptare (1975) ... Distributor
Gëzimi në sytë e nënës (1975) ... Distributor
Gjithmon në reshta (1975) ... Distributor
Gjurmë lirie (1975) ... Distributor
Jeta e përmendoreve (1975) ... Distributor
Kur hiqen maskat (1975) ... Distributor
Kursim, kursim, kursim (1975) ... Distributor
Lulet dekorative (1975) ... Distributor
Me amatorët e fshatit (1975) ... Distributor
Mjekja e fshatit (1975) ... Distributor
Në fillim të verës (1975) ... Distributor
Në gjurmët e një tradite (1975) ... Distributor
Në prag të një përvjetori (1975) ... Distributor
Për popullin, me popullin (1975) ... Distributor
Pranë jetës, pranë njerzëve (1975) ... Distributor
Qylymat tanë (1975) ... Distributor
Reportazh nga Këmishtaj (1975) ... Distributor
Reportazh nga Tropoja (1975) ... Distributor
Roje vigjilente (1975) ... Distributor
Rruga e suksesit (1975) ... Distributor
Rrugicat që kërkonin diell (1975) ... Distributor
Sa më shumë naftë Atdheut (1975) ... Distributor
Shkolla jonë (1975) ... Distributor
Shtegtim montatorësh (1975) ... Distributor
Traktoristja (1975) ... Distributor
Udhëtim në pranverë (1975) ... Distributor
Vajza me pata (1975) ... Distributor
Vatër dijesh, vatër lirie (1975) ... Distributor
Vullnetarët në metallurgji (1975) ... Distributor
Zana dhe Miri (1975) ... Distributor
Ansambli ynë në Kore (1974) ... Distributor
Arti i punimit në dru (1974) ... Distributor
Arti shqiptarë në shekuj (1974) ... Distributor
Brigada e 19-të sulmuese (1974) ... Distributor
Brigada e shtatë e vegjëlisë (1974) ... Distributor
Cuca e maleve (1974) ... Distributor
Duke kërkuar pesëorëshin (1974) ... Distributor
Duke përdorur rrezatimet bërthamore (1974) ... Distributor
E vërteta mbi fenë (1974) ... Distributor
Gjithmonë në rritje (1974) ... Distributor
Kënga partizane (1974) ... Distributor
Kujdes zjarri (1974) ... Distributor
Lufta për bukën (1974) ... Distributor
Me ndërtuesit e një vepre (1974) ... Distributor
Midis miqëve të shtrenjtë (1974) ... Distributor
Miq në festën tonë (1974) ... Distributor
Misrat hibride (1974) ... Distributor
Monumentet e natyrës (1974) ... Distributor
Muslim Peza (1974) ... Distributor
Nepër rrugët e një qyteti (1974) ... Distributor
Ngjall liri brigada jonë (1974) ... Distributor
Një firmë e hekurt (1974) ... Distributor
Përjetërsi (1974) ... Distributor
Pranë hapave të para (1974) ... Distributor
Qyteti më i ri në botë (1974) ... Distributor
Rozafat (1974) ... Distributor
Rruge te bardha (1974) ... Distributor
Shpërthimi (1974) ... Distributor
Shtatori në trase (1974) ... Distributor
Shtigje të luftës (1974) ... Distributor
Sulmon kudo me furi (1974) ... Distributor
Trofetë e fitoreve (1974) ... Distributor
Viti 1924 (1974) ... Distributor
1 Maj 1973 (1973) ... Distributor
Ata quheshin Arbër (1973) ... Distributor
Brazdat (1973) ... Distributor
Çervenaka (1973) ... Distributor
Deputeti (1973) ... Distributor
Dy endjet (1973) ... Distributor
Fierzë (1973) ... Distributor
Gjuha jonë (1973) ... Distributor
Këndojnë fëmijët tanë (1973) ... Distributor
Këndon Tefta Tashko Koço (1973) ... Distributor
Krevati i Perandorit (1973) ... Distributor
Mimoza llastica (1973) ... Distributor
Mozaik këngësh dhe vallesh kosovare (1973) ... Distributor
Nëna partizane (1973) ... Distributor
Nepër fushat e futbollit (1973) ... Distributor
Nepër unazën e metalurgjikut (1973) ... Distributor
Operacioni Zjarri (1973) ... Distributor
Perla e Jugut (1973) ... Distributor
Sukses i merituar (1973) ... Distributor
Urbanistika e fshatit tonë (1973) ... Distributor
Uzinë dhe shkollë (1973) ... Distributor
Vajza Pukjane (1973) ... Distributor
Vetëgroposja (1973) ... Distributor
Artistët kinezë në vendin tonë (1972) ... Distributor
Basketbollistja nr. 10 (1972) ... Distributor
Bekim Fehmiu në Shqipëri (1972) ... Distributor
Delegacioni kinez i bujqësisë në vendin tonë (1972) ... Distributor
Delegacioni qeveritar Korean në vendinë tonë (1972) ... Distributor
Duke filluar nga vehtja (1972) ... Distributor
Ekspozita e arteve figurative (1972) ... Distributor
Filloi një ditë e re (1972) ... Distributor
Gurë të çmuar (1972) ... Distributor
Jehonë këngësh (1972) ... Distributor
Jeta e një vepre (1972) ... Distributor
Kapedani (1972) ... Distributor
Kongresi i 6 PPSH (1972) ... Distributor
Kongresi i dytë Kombëtar i Studimeve Shoqërore (1972) ... Distributor
Kuvendet Ilire (1972) ... Distributor
Lashtësi e një qyteti (1972) ... Distributor
Me banorët e pyjeve tona (1972) ... Distributor
Me emrin tënd, Parti (1972) ... Distributor
Metalurgjia e zezë (1972) ... Distributor
Motive dibrane (1972) ... Distributor
Ndërgjegja (1972) ... Distributor
Para shfaqjes (1972) ... Distributor
Shkolla tingujt ngjyra (1972) ... Distributor
Shoku Enver Hoxha në rethin e Matit (1972) ... Distributor
Shqipëria turistike (1972) ... Distributor
Teatri krahinor i Prishtinës në Shqipëri (1972) ... Distributor
Tregim i sharaxhiut (1972) ... Distributor
Trenistët (1972) ... Distributor
Vëllezërit Topulli (1972) ... Distributor
Vështrim përmes mijëvjeçarëve (1972) ... Distributor
Yjet e neteve te gjata (1972) ... Distributor
ABC...ZH (1971) ... Distributor
Bashkpuntorë me artistët (1971) ... Distributor
Delegacioni i punëtorëve kinezë në vendin tonë (1971) ... Distributor
Ekspozita Shqipëria (1971) ... Distributor
Gëzim me Vllehët (1971) ... Distributor
Hapat e para (1971) ... Distributor
Kënga e re (1971) ... Distributor
Lajmëtari i festivalit (1971) ... Distributor
Malet me blerim mbuluar (1971) ... Distributor
Mbrohemi duke sulmuar (1971) ... Distributor
Mëngjeze lufte (1971) ... Distributor
Më shumë mish për popullin (1971) ... Distributor
Mësimi për Linden (1971) ... Distributor
Në gjurmët e novatorëve (1971) ... Distributor
Në shtëpinë e foshnjës (1971) ... Distributor
Ninshi, fshat i ri socialist (1971) ... Distributor
Prova e parë (1971) ... Distributor
Punojmë, mendojmë, mësojmë (1971) ... Distributor
Qytetet ilire (1971) ... Distributor
Rruga e një brigade (1971) ... Distributor
Shkolla dhe rrugët e jetës (1971) ... Distributor
Takim me artin revolucionar kinez (1971) ... Distributor
Të njohim më mirë tokën bujqësore (1971) ... Distributor
Toka dhe njerzit (1971) ... Distributor
Udhëtim me detarët tanë (1971) ... Distributor
Viktor Eftimiu në Shqipëri (1971) ... Distributor
10 ditë sulmi (1970) ... Distributor
1 Maj 1970 (1970) ... Distributor
Aksion për ndërtimin e banesave (1970) ... Distributor
Artet figurative me temën e LNÇ (1970) ... Distributor
Drita e partisë (1970) ... Distributor
Ekspozita e miqësisë së madhe (1970) ... Distributor
Faqe e lavdishme e historisë sonë (1970) ... Distributor
Furra (1970) ... Distributor
Higjiena e ushtarit (1970) ... Distributor
I teti ne bronz (1970) ... Distributor
Kërkuesit e metaleve dhe Saldatorët (1970) ... Distributor
Kujdes (1970) ... Distributor
Me ritmin e jetës (1970) ... Distributor
Më shumë perime për popullin (1970) ... Distributor
Miq nga Vietnami heroik (1970) ... Distributor
Nepër kantieret e Hidrocentralit (1970) ... Distributor
Në portin e Durrësit (1970) ... Distributor
Në turnet e natës (1970) ... Distributor
Nga festivali i shtëpisë së fëmijës (1970) ... Distributor
Për mbrojtjen gjatë punës (1970) ... Distributor
Productione Albanaises (1970) ... Distributor
Tingujt dhe fëmijët (1970) ... Distributor

1980s
Djali elastik (1989) ... Distributor
Edhe kështu edhe ashtu (1989) ... Distributor
Historiani dhe kameleoni (1989) ... Distributor
Kush ishte vrasësi (1989) ... Distributor
Lumi që nuk shteron (1989) ... Distributor
Muri i gjallë (1989) ... Distributor
Njerëz në rrymë (1989) ... Distributor
Ariana (1988) ... Distributor
Babai i studentit (1988) ... Distributor
Bregu i ashpër (1988) ... Distributor
Flutura në kabinen time (1988) ... Distributor
Kënga Përmetare (1988) ... Distributor
Kështjella e këngëve (1988) ... Distributor
Misioni përtej detit (1988) ... Distributor
Muzikanti Arbër (1988) ... Distributor
Një i tretë (1988) ... Distributor
Një kohë tjetër (1988) ... Distributor
Pesha e kohës (1988) ... Distributor
Rekonstruksioni (1988) (TV) ... Distributor
Shkëlqimi i përkohëshëm (1988) ... Distributor
Shpresa (1988) ... Distributor
Sinjali i dashurisë (1988) ... Distributor
Stolat në park (1988) ... Distributor
Treni niset më shtatë pa pesë (1988) ... Distributor
Tre vetë kapërxejnë malin (1988) ... Distributor
Vija të bardha (1988) ... Distributor
Binarët (1987) ... Distributor
Botë e padukshme (1987) ... Distributor
Drita e diturisë (1987) ... Distributor
Eja! (1987) ... Distributor
Familja ime (1987) ... Distributor
Fizika bërthamore (1987) ... Distributor
Inciativa masave garanci për suksese (1987) ... Distributor
Këmishët me dyllë (1987) ... Distributor
Me blektorët (1987) ... Distributor
Me detarët e linjave të largëta (1987) ... Distributor
Në emër të lirisë (1987) ... Distributor
Një vitë i gjatë (1987) ... Distributor
Novatorët e portit (1987) ... Distributor
Përralle Nga e Kaluara (1987) ... Distributor
Pësëri Pranverë (1987) ... Distributor
Rrethi i kujtesës (1987) ... Distributor
Shtegtimi (1987) ... Distributor
Tela për violinë (1987) ... Distributor
Telefoni i një mëngjesi (1987) ... Distributor
Vrasje ne gjueti (1987) ... Distributor
Zëvendësi i grave (1987) ... Distributor
Bardhë e zi (1986) ... Distributor
Bilbil Matohiti (1986) ... Distributor
Dhe vjen një ditë (1986) ... Distributor
Dy herë mat (1986) ... Distributor
Fillim i vështirë (1986) ... Distributor
Fjalë pa fund (1986) ... Distributor
Gabimi (1986) ... Distributor
Guri i besës (1986) ... Distributor
Kronikë e atyre viteve (1986) ... Distributor
Kur happen dyert e jetës (1986) ... Distributor
Kur ndahesh nga shokët (1986) ... Distributor
Laçi qytet industrial (1986) ... Distributor
Një jetë më shumë (1986) ... Distributor
Rrethimi i vogël (1986) ... Distributor
Rron Enveri rron Partia (1986) ... Distributor
Rron o rron e s'vdes shqiptari (1986) ... Distributor
Shqipëria në festë (1986) ... Distributor
Spartakiada (1986) ... Distributor
Tiktaku i fundit (1986) ... Distributor
Tokë e njerëzve të rinjë (1986) ... Distributor
Tri ditë nga një jetë (1986) ... Distributor
Asgjë nuk harrohet (1985) ... Distributor
Bashkëkohësit (1985) ... Distributor
Bashkëqytetari ynë (1985) ... Distributor
Brigjeve të Prespës (1985) ... Distributor
Dimri dhe fëmijët (1985) ... Distributor
Fanfara e të vegjëlve (1985) ... Distributor
Fidanishtja e ushtrisë (1985) ... Distributor
Gurët e shtëpisë sime (1985) ... Distributor
Hije që mbeten pas (1985) ... Distributor
Ju përshëndes (1985) ... Distributor
Kur nis një këngë (1985) ... Distributor
Manifestim i madhë (1985) ... Distributor
Me flamujt e Enverit (1985) ... Distributor
Melodi e pandërprerë (1985) ... Distributor
Mondi dhe Diana (1985) ... Distributor
Në prag të jetës (1985) ... Distributor
Pranverë e hidhur (1985) ... Distributor
Të mos heshtësh (1985) ... Distributor
Te paftuarit (1985) ... Distributor
Tre njerëz me guna (1985) ... Distributor
Arti mesjetar (1984) ... Distributor
Asim Vokshi (1984) ... Distributor
Çdo vijë një vizatim (1984) ... Distributor
Dasma e shtyrë (1984) ... Distributor
Ditë në trasë (1984) ... Distributor
Djemtë e Valiasit (1984) ... Distributor
Dje pa diell, sot pa natë (1984) ... Distributor
Drejt frymëzimeve (1984) ... Distributor
Duaje emrin tënd (1984) ... Distributor
Endërr për një karrikë (1984) ... Distributor
Eposi i kreshnikëve (1984) ... Distributor
Fejesa e Blertës (1984) ... Distributor
Fushë e blertë fushë e kuqe (1984) ... Distributor
Gjrmë në dëborë (1984) ... Distributor
Helmës (1984) ... Distributor
I çoni fjalë nënës (1984) ... Distributor
Kur flasim për poezinë (1984) ... Distributor
Kush vdes në këmbë (1984) ... Distributor
Letër nga Komani (1984) ... Distributor
Lumi i jetës (1984) ... Distributor
Lundrimi i parë (1984) ... Distributor
Militanti (1984) ... Distributor
Nata e parë e lirisë (1984) ... Distributor
Në rrugë të reja (1984) ... Distributor
Një jetë pranë njrëzve (1984) ... Distributor
Njeriu prej bore (1984) ... Distributor
Nxënsit e klasës sime (1984) ... Distributor
Piku (1984) ... Distributor
Po lufton Idriz Seferi (1984) ... Distributor
Pranvera dy hapa pranë (1984) ... Distributor
Pritje dhe takime miqësore (1984) ... Distributor
Shirat e vjeshtës (1984) ... Distributor
Shkolla rrëz Alpeve (1984) ... Distributor
Shokë të një skuadre (1984) ... Distributor
Taulanti kërkon një motër (1984) ... Distributor
Toka të begata (1984) ... Distributor
Troku (1984) ... Distributor
Vendimi (1984) ... Distributor
Kohë e largët (1983) ... Distributor
Apasionata (1983) ... Distributor
Bijtë e rrugicave të kalldrëmta (1983) ... Distributor
Bilbili mëndjelehtë (1983) ... Distributor
Brigada novatore (1983) ... Distributor
Dora e ngrohtë (1983) ... Distributor
Dritat e qytezës (1983) ... Distributor
Duar dhe zemra bashkuar (1983) ... Distributor
Energjetika (1983) ... Distributor
Enver Hoxha, tungjatjeta (1983) ... Distributor
Fundi i një gjakmarrjeje (1983) ... Distributor
Gjithmon zgjuar (1983) ... Distributor
Gracka (1983) ... Distributor
Nepër ditarët e luftës (1983) ... Distributor
Një emër midis njerzëve (1983) ... Distributor
Pishtarë të dritës në Kosovë (1983) ... Distributor
Roskidë (1983) ... Distributor
Të përjetshëm midis nesh (1983) ... Distributor
Tetori i këngëve (1983) ... Distributor
Zogu pushbardhë-1 (1983) ... Distributor
Zogu pushbardhë-2 (1983) ... Distributor
Besa e kuqe (1982) ... Distributor
Bishti (1982) ... Distributor
Blerim në bregdet (1982) ... Distributor
Dy gosti (1982) ... Distributor
Edhe thërrimet janë bukë (1982) ... Distributor
Flaka e maleve (1982) ... Distributor
Kryengritjet e mëdha (1982) ... Distributor
Muzeu Historik Kombëtar (1982) ... Distributor
Në ditët e pushimit (1982) ... Distributor
Nëntori i dytë (1982) ... Distributor
Në unitet të çeliktë (1982) ... Distributor
Nga bullonat te makineritë dhe fabrikat komplekse (1982) ... Distributor
Një ditë në Kutalli (1982) ... Distributor
Njeriu i mirë (1982) ... Distributor
Një vonesë e vogël (1982) ... Distributor
Novatorët e drurit (1982) ... Distributor
Përvoja e Vrinës (1982) ... Distributor
Qortimet e vjeshtës (1982) ... Distributor
Rruga e lirisë (1982) ... Distributor
Shokët (1982) ... Distributor
Shtypi ynë i luftës (1982) ... Distributor
Vellezer dhe shoke (1982) ... Distributor
Arbëreshët (1981) ... Distributor
Avni Rustemi (1981) ... Distributor
Banesat popullore (1981) ... Distributor
Dita e parë e emrimit (1981) ... Distributor
Djaloshi prej dëbore (1981) ... Distributor
Fëmijët tanë një këngë e bukur (1981) ... Distributor
Gëzofrat tona (1981) ... Distributor
Gjurmë në kaltërsi (1981) ... Distributor
Jeta buzë liqenit (1981) ... Distributor
Jeta e një tribuni (1981) ... Distributor
Kërcënimi (1981) ... Distributor
Kur xhirohej një film (1981) ... Distributor
Lufta për jetën (1981) ... Distributor
Me alpinistët e vegjël (1981) ... Distributor
Në prag të lirisë (1981) ... Distributor
Në skenat e Francës (1981) ... Distributor
Në udhët e vitit 2010 (1981) ... Distributor
Një natë pa dritë (1981) ... Distributor
Plaku dhe hasmi (1981) ... Distributor
Shoku ynë Tili (1981) ... Distributor
Shtëpia jonë e përbashkët (1981) ... Distributor
Si gjithë të tjerët (1981) ... Distributor
Thesari (1981) ... Distributor
Tokat e thata (1981) ... Distributor
Udhëve të hekurta (1981) ... Distributor
Veshjet popullore shqiptare (1981) ... Distributor
Volejbollistet koperativiste (1981) ... Distributor
Aleksandër Xhuvani (1980) ... Distributor
Ansambli i valleve popullore Eleni Caulli (1980) ... Distributor
Besniku i Partise (1980) ... Distributor
Bijtë e heroinës (1980) ... Distributor
Burim i madhë kursimesh (1980) ... Distributor
Dëshmorët e monumenteve (1980) ... Distributor
Dhimbje midis dy brigjeve (1980) ... Distributor
Ditë vjeshte në Plasë (1980) ... Distributor
Eksperienca e Buçimasit (1980) ... Distributor
Ekspozita Shqipëria sot (1980) ... Distributor
Fontana e pusit C-37 (1980) ... Distributor
Gëzhoja e vjetër (1980) ... Distributor
Intendanti (1980) ... Distributor
Karl Gega (1980) ... Distributor
Karnavalet (1980) ... Distributor
Ku burojnë meloditë (1980) ... Distributor
Mbrojtja në punë (1980) ... Distributor
Mëngjeze të reja (1980) ... Distributor
Minerale dhe metale për export (1980) ... Distributor
Mjeshtret e vogla gjimnaste (1980) ... Distributor
Mozaikët (1980) ... Distributor
Ne cdo stine (1980) ... Distributor
Në prag të jetës (1980) ... Distributor
Një gjeneral kapet rob (1980) ... Distributor
Një ndodhi në port (1980) ... Distributor
Një shoqe nga fshati (1980) ... Distributor
Nusja (1980) ... Distributor
Para së gjithash sigurimi teknik (1980) ... Distributor
Partizani i vogël Velo (1980) ... Distributor
Pas vdekjes (1980) ... Distributor
Piktura shqiptare në mesjetë (1980) ... Distributor
Qitëset (1980) ... Distributor
Riatdhesimi i ushtarëve grekë (1980) ... Distributor
Riza Burja (1980) ... Distributor
Sketerre 43 (1980) ... Distributor
Traditat tona në lundrim (1980) ... Distributor
Ylli i të trembëdhjetëave (1980) ... Distributor

1990s
Vdekja e kalit (1995) ... Distributor
Zemra e nënës (1995) ... Distributor
Një ditë nga një jetë (1994) ... Distributor
Plumbi prej plasteline (1994) ... Distributor
Të burgosurit e galerisë (1994) ... Distributor
E diela e fundit (1993) ... Distributor
Kush qesh i funditë (1993) ... Distributor
Qind për qind (1993) ... Distributor
Trëndafili magjik (1993) ... Distributor
Pas fasadës (1992) ... Distributor
Bardh e zi (1991) ... Distributor
Enigma (1991) ... Distributor
Vdekja e burrit (1991) ... Distributor
Balada e Kurbinit (1990) ... Distributor
Inxhinieri i minierës (1990) ... Distributor
Jeta në duart e tjetrit (1990) ... Distributor
Kronika e një nate (1990) ... Distributor
Ngjyrat e moshës (1990) ... Distributor
Një djalë edhe një vajzë (1990) ... Distributor
Pas takimit të fundit (1990) ... Distributor
Shpella e piratevet (1990) ... Distributor
Vetmi (1990) ... Distributor
Vitet e pritjes (1990) ... Distributor
Dëshpërimisht (2000) ... Distributor
Rimodelim (2000) ... Distributor

References

External links
Official website

Film distributors
Film production companies of Albania